Rokautskyia sanctaluciae is a species of flowering plant in the family Bromeliaceae, endemic to Brazil (the state of Espírito Santo). It was first described in 2008 as Cryptanthus sanctaluciae.

References

sanctaluciae
Flora of Brazil
Plants described in 2008